Following is a  list of notable architects from Romania.

A to M

 Petre Antonescu (1873-1965)
 Gheorghe Asachi (1788-1869)
 Doina Marilena Ciocănea (born 1951)
 Maria Cotescu (1896-1980)
 Horia Creangă (1892-1943).
 Radu Dudescu (1894-1983)
 Haralamb H. Georgescu (1908-1977)
 Marcel Iancu (1895-1984)
 Károly Kós (1883-1977)
 Cezar Lăzărescu (1923-1986)
 Dimitrie Maimarolu (1859-1926)
 Duiliu Marcu (1885-1966)
 Ion Mincu (1852-1912)

N to Z

 Alexandru Orăscu (1817-1894)

 Edmond van Saanen Algi (1882-1938)

 Toma T. Socolescu (1883-1960)

 Rosalia Spirer (1900-1990)

References

See also

 Architecture of Romania
 List of architects
 List of Romanians

Romania
Architects